Applied Psycholinguistics is a peer-reviewed academic journal in the field of psycholinguistics. It covers research on all aspects of this field, including language development and language disorders, especially studies made from a cross-language perspective. The journal was established in 1980 and is published quarterly by Cambridge University Press. The current editor-in-chief is Martha Crago (Dalhousie University).

Abstracting and indexing
Applied Psycholinguistics is abstracted and indexed in:
 CSA Linguistics & Language Behavior Abstracts
 CSA Sociological Abstracts
 Social Sciences Citation Index
 Current Contents
 Multicultural Education Abstracts
 Modern Language Association
 Current Index to Journals in Education
 Child Development Abstracts
 Special Educational Needs Abstracts

References

External links
Journal homepage

English-language journals
Cambridge University Press academic journals
Quarterly journals
Publications established in 1980
Psycholinguistics journals